Ernest Louis (25 November 1868 – 9 October 1937) was the last Grand Duke of Hesse and by Rhine, reigning from 1892 until 1918.

Early life

Ernest Louis was the elder son of Louis IV, Grand Duke of Hesse and by Rhine and Princess Alice of the United Kingdom, daughter of Queen Victoria and Prince Albert of Saxe-Coburg and Gotha. He was named Louis after his father. His nickname was "Ernie". One of seven siblings, two of whom died in childhood, Ernest grew up with his four surviving sisters in Darmstadt. One of his younger sisters, Alexandra, would marry Tsar Nicholas II, the last Emperor of Russia, while another sister, Victoria Mountbatten, would be the mother of Queen Louise of Sweden, Louis Mountbatten and Princess Alice of Battenberg, who was the mother of Prince Philip, Duke of Edinburgh.

Ernest Louis grew up in a loving household, with parents who demonstrated their affection for their children, something not typical for that social stratum in those days. He grew much attached to his parents and siblings, and it was his misfortune that he was fated to witness several deaths among them during his childhood. When he was five, his only brother Prince Friedrich died. The two boys had been playing a game when the younger boy, who suffered from haemophilia, fell through a window onto the balcony twenty feet below. Ernest Louis was inconsolable. "When I die, you must die too, and all the others. Why can't we all die together? I don't want to die alone, like Frittie," he told his nurse. To his mother he said, "I dreamt that I was dead and was gone up to Heaven, and there I asked God to let me have Frittie again and he came to me and took my hand."

In 1878, when Ernest was ten, an epidemic of diphtheria swept through Darmstadt. His father and all the children, except Elisabeth, who was visiting her paternal grandmother, fell ill. Princess Alice cared for her sick husband and children, but on 16 November, the youngest of them, Princess Marie, died. Alice kept the news from her family for several weeks, until Ernest Louis, who was devoted to little Marie, asked for his sister. When his mother revealed Marie's death, Ernest Louis was overcome with grief. In comforting her grieving son, Alice kissed him. She fell ill within a week, and died on 14 December, the anniversary of her own father's death.

Marriages

First marriage
On 19 April 1894, at Schloss Ehrenburg, Ernest Louis married his maternal first cousin, Princess Victoria Melita of Edinburgh ("Ducky"), the daughter of his mother's brother, Prince Alfred. The match was actively encouraged by their mutual grandmother, Queen Victoria, who attended the wedding. At the wedding, Ernest's youngest surviving sister, Alix, became engaged to marry Tsarevich Nicholas of Russia, and the excitement of that imminent match threw the nuptial celebrations into the shade.

Ernest and Victoria Melita had two children:
 a daughter, Elisabeth (11 March 1895 – 16 November 1903). Her early death at age 8 of typhoid fever greatly devastated her father who wrote "My little Elisabeth" in his memoirs "was the sunshine of my life" 30 years after her death.
 stillborn son on 25 May 1900.

Ernest and Victoria entertained in style, frequently holding house parties for young friends (anybody above 30 was deemed "too old" by Victoria), dispensing with formality on those occasions to indulge in fun and frolic; Victoria's cousin Prince Nicholas of Greece and Denmark remembered one stay with them as having been "the jolliest, merriest house party to which I have ever been in my life." These revelries were more in keeping with Victoria's inclinations than Ernest's. Their marriage was unhappy due to differences in temperament and attitude. Fond as she was of revelry, Victoria was less enthusiastic about fulfilling her public role. She avoided answering letters, put off visits to elderly relations whose company she did not enjoy, and talked to people who amused her at official functions while ignoring people of higher social or official standing whom she found boring. Victoria's inattention to her duties provoked quarrels with Ernest. The young couple had loud arguments which sometimes turned physical. The volatile Victoria shouted, threw tea trays, smashed china against the wall, and tossed anything that was handy at Ernest during their arguments.

Queen Victoria was saddened when she heard of the trouble in the marriage from Sir George Buchanan, her chargé d'affaires at Darmstadt, but because of their daughter, Elisabeth, she refused to consider permitting her grandchildren to divorce. Ernest also held off from divorce mainly for this reason. He adored his daughter to distraction and lavished his time and attention on her. The child reciprocated her father's affection, preferred the company of her father to that of her mother. Meanwhile, all efforts to rekindle the marriage failed; Victoria took to spending most of the year in the south of France, spending vast sums in expenses and at the card-tables in Monte Carlo. When Queen Victoria died in January 1901, significant opposition to the end of the marriage was removed. The couple were divorced 21 December 1901 on grounds of "invincible mutual antipathy" by a special verdict of the Supreme Court of Hesse. After the divorce had come through, Victoria told some close relatives that Ernest was a homosexual. Allegedly, she had caught her husband in bed with a male servant when, in 1897, she returned home from a visit to her sister Queen Marie of Romania. She did not make her accusation public, but told her sister that "no boy was safe, from the stable hands to the kitchen help. He slept quite openly with them all." Victoria later married another first cousin, this time on her mother's side, while Ernest married Eleonore of Solms-Hohensolms-Lich.

Second marriage
Ernest Louis remarried in Darmstadt, on 2 February 1905, to Princess Eleonore of Solms-Hohensolms-Lich (17 September 1871 – 16 November 1937). This marriage proved harmonious and happy. The couple had two sons:
 Georg Donatus, Hereditary Grand Duke of Hesse (1906–1937). He married Ernest's grand-niece, Princess Cecilie of Greece and Denmark, a sister of Prince Philip, Duke of Edinburgh, and had issue. The couple and two of their young sons were killed in a plane crash in 1937, leaving behind a daughter who also died two years later, while yet a child.
 Louis, Prince of Hesse and by Rhine (1908–1968), who married Margaret Campbell Geddes, daughter of Auckland Geddes, 1st Baron Geddes; no issue. Louis adopted Moritz, Landgrave of Hesse as his heir, thereby uniting the two lines of the Hesse family.

In addition to his marriage, Ernest Louis maintained a close friendship with the bisexual Karl August Lingner, the inventor of Odol, one of the first liquid mouthwashes. When Lingner died of tongue cancer, he bequeathed Tarasp Castle in Switzerland to Ernest Louis. However, the Hesse family never lived in it, and it was sold in 2016.

Grand Duke of Hesse
In 1892, Ernest Louis succeeded his father as grand duke.

Throughout his life, Ernest Louis was a patron of the arts, founding the Darmstadt Artists' Colony, and was himself an author of poems, plays, essays, and piano compositions.

Ernest Louis commissioned the New Mausoleum in 1903. It was consecrated on 3 November 1910, in the presence of the Grand Duke and his immediate family, that is to say, his wife Eleonore, Tsar Nicholas II and his two sisters, the Tsarina Alexandra Feodorovna of Russia, Grand Duchess Elisabeth Feodorovna (Ella), Victoria, Princess Louis of Battenberg and her daughter, Louise, and Princess Heinrich of Prussia accompanied by her husband. The remains of Grand Duke Ludwig IV, Princess Alice, Grand Duchess of Hesse and by Rhine along with their children 'Frittie' and 'May' were re-interred in the New Mausoleum.

First World War

During World War I, Ernest Louis served as a general of the infantry at Kaiser Wilhelm's headquarters. In February, 1917, the February Revolution in Russia forced his brother-in-law, Tsar Nicholas II, to abdicate. Sixteen months later, in July 1918, his two sisters in Russia, Elizabeth, the widow of Grand Duke Sergei Alexandrovich, and Alexandra, the wife of Nicholas II, were murdered by the Bolsheviks, Alexandra dying alongside her husband and children. At the end of the war, he lost his throne during the revolution of 1918, after refusing to abdicate.

Death
In October 1937, Ernest Louis died after a long illness at Schloß Wolfsgarten, near Darmstadt. He received what amounted to a state funeral on 16 November 1937 and was buried next to his daughter, Elisabeth, in a new open air burial ground next to the New Mausoleum he had built in the Rosenhöhe park in Darmstadt.

Honours
He received the following orders and decorations:
German honours

Foreign honours

Ancestry

References

External links

 

1868 births
1937 deaths
House of Hesse-Darmstadt
Hereditary Grand Dukes of Hesse
Nobility from Darmstadt
German Army generals of World War I
Burials at the Mausoleum for the Grand Ducal House of Hesse, Rosenhöhe (Darmstadt)
Monarchs who abdicated
Generals of Infantry (Prussia)
Extra Knights Companion of the Garter
Annulled Honorary Knights Grand Cross of the Order of the Bath
Grand Crosses of the Order of Saint Stephen of Hungary
Grand Crosses of the Order of the Star of Romania
Recipients of the Order of the White Eagle (Russia)
Recipients of the Order of St. Anna, 1st class
Recipients of the Order of St. Vladimir, 4th class
Knights of the Golden Fleece of Spain
Military personnel from Darmstadt